The 2013–14 PBA season was the 39th season of the Philippine Basketball Association. The season formally opened on November 17, 2013, and finished on July 9, 2014. The league continued to use the three-conference format, starting with the Philippine Cup, or the traditional All-Filipino Conference. The Commissioner's Cup and the Governors' Cup is the second and third conferences for this season.

Due to the Philippines' hosting of the 2013 FIBA Asia Championship last August, the third conference of the previous season, the 2013 PBA Governors' Cup was rescheduled to start on August 13. Subsequently, the annual draft and the opening of the new season, which is usually held every last week of August and first week of October respectively since 2004, was moved to November.

The first activity of the season was the 2013 PBA draft held on November 3.

Board of governors

Executive committee
 Angelico Salud (Commissioner) 
 Ramon Segismundo (chairman, representing Meralco Bolts)
 Patrick Gregorio (Vice-chairman, representing Talk 'N Text Tropang Texters)
 Robert Non (Treasurer, representing San Miguel Beermen)

Teams

Arenas

Like several Metro Manila-centric leagues, most games are held at arenas within Metro Manila, and sometimes, Antipolo. Games outside this area are called "out-of-town" games, and are usually played on Saturdays. Provincial arenas usually host one game, rarely two; these arenas typically host only once per season, but could return occasionally.

Main arenas

Out-of-town arenas

Pre-season events

Player movement

Key transactions:

Notable occurrences
The fifth PBA Hall of Fame ceremony was held during the opening ceremonies of the 2013−14 PBA season. This year's inductees includes players Benjie Paras, Ronnie Magsanoc, Lim Eng Beng and coach Ed Ocampo
The PBA's developmental league held its first draft on September 19. Subsequently, the new D-League season began on October 24.
Possible changes of the season calendar will be further discussed between the league and the Samahang Basketbol ng Pilipinas for the preparation of the Philippines men's national basketball team for the 2014 FIBA Basketball World Cup, which was scheduled to be held in Spain from August 30 to September 14, 2014.
Sports5 transferred the broadcast of the PBA games to their main network TV5. Also, Fox Sports will air live simulcasts of the Wednesday doubleheaders in English commentary, starting November 20, 2013.
A second version of the Jun Bernardino Trophy was created after the 2006 trophy was awarded to the Talk 'N Text Tropang Texters after they won the Philippine Cup for the third consecutive year last season.

Coaching changes
 Junel Baculi is replaced by Richie Ticzon as head coach of the GlobalPort Batang Pier.

Opening ceremonies
The opening ceremonies for this season were held in three different locations, one each representing Luzon (Smart Araneta Coliseum, Quezon City), Visayas (Cebu Coliseum), and Mindanao (USEP Gymnasium, Davao City), while the main ceremonies was held at the Smart Araneta Coliseum in Quezon City.

The muses for the participating teams are as follows:

2013–14 Philippine Cup

Notable events
 On January 13, 2014, San Miguel Corporation president Ramon S. Ang announced that the Petron Blaze Boosters will revert to its iconic name "San Miguel Beermen" starting in the 2014 PBA Commissioner's Cup.
 On January 29, 2014, GlobalPort owner Mikee Romero announced that interim coach Richie Ticzon will replaced by Pido Jarencio as head coach of GlobalPort Batang Pier starting next conference.
 The league's board of governors approved the proposal of shortening the finals series of the Commissioner's and Governors' Cups to a best-of-five to give time for the Philippine men's national basketball team time to prepare for the 2014 FIBA Basketball World Cup and the 2014 Asian Games. The opening of the 2014–15 season will also be moved to October 19.
 On February 12, 2014, the seventh game of the 2013-14 PBA Philippine Cup Semifinals series between Barangay Ginebra San Miguel and San Mig Super Coffee Mixers set the all-time basketball attendance record of 24,883, which broke the previous record of 23,436 set on May 19, 2013, that featured Game Three of the PBA Commissioner's Cup Finals between the Alaska Aces and the Barangay Ginebra San Miguel.
 The Rain or Shine Elasto Painters staged a "partial walkout" during Game 6 of their Finals series against the San Mig Super Coffee Mixers at the 10:59 mark of the second quarter. Rain or Shine returned to the playing court before the 15-minute time limit given to teams who walks out of the playing court and eventually lost to San Mig Super Coffee.
 On February 25, 2014, Petron Blaze/San Miguel Beer board governor Ely Capacio died following a stroke The league paid tribute to him before the start of Game 5 of the Philippine Cup Finals. Also, the San Mig Super Coffee Mixers, which was coached by Capacio in 1991, had black patches in their jerseys as a sign of mourning.
 San Mig Super Coffee coach Tim Cone became the winning-est coach in PBA history after his team clinched his 16th title. He surpassed the record of 15 championships set by Baby Dalupan before he retired as a coach in 1991.
 The San Mig Super Coffee Mixers became the team with most All-Filipino/Philippine Cup championships after winning their sixth Philippine Cup, surpassing the Crispa Redmanizers with five All-Filipino titles.
 PBA Commissioner Chito Salud penalized the Rain or Shine Elasto Painters with a P2 million for their "partial walkout" during the 2nd quarter (11:49) of their Finals in Game 6 series against the San Mig Super Coffee Mixers.
 Rain or Shine coach Yeng Guiao accumulated a record total of P426,400 worth of fines due to a league rule that penalizes a coach, player or official that receives more than nine technical fouls in a conference after incurring 13 technicals during the tournament (P50,000 each technical foul), and the P100,000 fine sanctioned to him after flashing the finger at league officials during the semifinals.

Elimination round

Playoffs

Quarterfinals 

|}

|}
*Team has twice-to-beat advantage. Team #1 only has to win once, while Team #2 has to win twice.

Semifinals 

|}

Finals 

|}
Finals MVP: Mark Barroca (San Mig Super Coffee Mixers)
Best Player of the Conference: June Mar Fajardo (Petron Blaze Boosters)

2014 Commissioner's Cup

Notable events
 Ever Bilena Incorporated owner Dioceldo Sy submitted a letter of intent for the application of his PBA D-League team, Black Water Sports in joining as an expansion team for the 2014–15 season. This was after Ever Bilena was given clearance of its financial capability to put up a PBA team.
 Columbian Autocar Corporation (CAC), the distributor of Kia cars in the Philippines submitted its letter of intent to join the PBA starting in the next 2014–15 season.
 Metro Pacific Investments Corporation, owners of the NLEX Road Warriors team in the PBA D-League has submitted its letter of intent to join the PBA as an expansion team.
 After the regular meeting of the PBA Board of Governors last March 6, PBA commissioner Chito Salud announced that he will review the submitted requirements of the three companies that applied for an expansion team to determine their financial and operating capability in having a PBA team. He will send his recommendations by April to the board of governors.
 The league's Board of Governors unanimously approved the application of Blackwater, Kia, and NLEX as expansion teams for the 2014–15 PBA season during their meeting on April 10. As a concession with Kia, who does not have a basketball team in the PBA D-League, the Board of Governors did not allow Blackwater and NLEX to sign up their players from their D-League teams. Instead, the expansion teams will build their teams through an expansion draft with the 10 existing teams will protect 14 players in their roster, the free agency and the rookie draft, in which the expansion teams will be given the 11th, 12th and 13th pick in the first round of the 2014 PBA draft.
 Additional concessions were given to the three expansion teams at the conclusion of the special meeting by the league's Board of Governors. These include the revision of the expansion draft in which the 10 existing teams will protect 12 players from the previous 14, and the first three picks of the second round of the 2014 PBA draft. Only the three expansion teams will be allowed to pick players after the third round of the rookie draft.
 Rain or Shine Elasto Painters coach Yeng Guiao was slapped with a P100,000 fine after an altercation with Meralco Bolts player Cliff Hodge and calling him "mongoloid" (a derogatory word used in the Philippines for persons who has Down syndrome)  after the second game of their best-of-three quarterfinals game. Meanwhile, Hodge's flagrant foul on Raymond Almazan on the same game was upgraded to flagrant foul penalty two and was fined with P20,000 
 Air21 Express made their first semifinals appearance in franchise history, after beating second-seeded San Miguel Beermen with the knockout game ending in two overtimes.
 Sports5 head Chot Reyes announced via Twitter that the PBA games will now be aired in high definition for Cignal Digital TV subscribers starting with the 2014 Commissioner's Cup Finals.

Elimination round

Playoffs

Quarterfinals 

|}

|}
*Team has twice-to-beat advantage. Team #1 only has to win once, while Team #2 has to win twice.

Semifinals 

|}

Finals 

|}
Finals MVP: James Yap (San Mig Super Coffee)
Best Player of the Conference: Jayson Castro (Talk 'N Text)
Bobby Parks Best Import of the Conference: Richard Howell (Talk 'N Text)

2014 Governors' Cup

Notable events
Jeffrey Cariaso was named as the head coach of Barangay Ginebra San Miguel. Olsen Racela was also transferred from San Mig Super Coffee to Barangay Ginebra to become the lead assistant coach.
Luigi Trillo resigned as head coach of the Alaska Aces due to family reasons and was replaced by Alex Compton.
The sale of the Air21 Express franchise to Metro Pacific Investments Corporation, owners of the NLEX Road Warriors has been approved by the PBA Board of Governors on June 26, 2014.

Elimination round

Playoffs

Quarterfinals 

|}*Team has twice-to-beat advantage. Team #1 only has to win once, while Team #2 has to win twice.

Semifinals 

|}

Finals 

|}
Finals MVP: James Yap (San Mig Super Coffee)
Best Player of the Conference: Ranidel de Ocampo (Talk 'N Text)
Bobby Parks Best Import of the Conference: Arizona Reid (Rain or Shine)

Individual awards

Leo Awards

Most Valuable Player: June Mar Fajardo (San Miguel)
Rookie of the Year: Greg Slaughter (Barangay Ginebra)
First Mythical Team:
Jayson Castro (Talk 'N Text)
Mark Barroca (San Mig Super Coffee)
June Mar Fajardo (San Miguel)
Ranidel de Ocampo (Talk 'N Text)
Asi Taulava (Air21)
Second Mythical Team:
Paul Lee (Rain or Shine)
PJ Simon (San Mig Super Coffee)
Greg Slaughter (Barangay Ginebra)
Marc Pingris (San Mig Super Coffee)
Sonny Thoss (Alaska)
All-Defensive Team:
Mark Barroca (San Mig Super Coffee)
Gabe Norwood (Rain or Shine)
June Mar Fajardo (San Miguel)
Jireh Ibañes (Rain or Shine)
Marc Pingris (San Mig Super Coffee)
Most Improved Player: June Mar Fajardo (San Miguel)
Sportsmanship Award: Willie Miller (Barako Bull)

Awards given by the PBA Press Corps
 Scoring Champion:  Jayson Castro (Talk 'N Text)
 Baby Dalupan Coach of the Year:  Tim Cone (San Mig Super Coffee)
 Mr. Quality Minutes: PJ Simon (San Mig Super Coffee)
 Comeback Player of the Year: Asi Taulava (Air21)
 Danny Floro Executive of the Year: Ramon S. Ang 
 Defensive Player of the Year: Marc Pingris (San Mig Super Coffee) 
All-Rookie Team
Greg Slaughter (Barangay Ginebra)
Ian Sangalang (San Mig Super Coffee)
Justin Melton (San Mig Super Coffee)
Terrence Romeo (GlobalPort)
Raymond Almazan (Rain or Shine)

Cumulative standings

Elimination rounds

Playoffs

References

External links
PBA.ph

 
PBA